Jesús Alberto Perales  (born ) is a Mexican male volleyball player. He was part of the Mexico men's national volleyball team at the Olympic Games 2016.

Early life

Career
During the summer of 2016, Perales along with Mexico men's national volleyball team, qualified for the first time in history to the Olympic Games through the World Olympic Qualification Tournament, which took place in their home turf in Mexico City.

Clubs
 Halcones (2014) 
 Virtus Guanajuato (2015-2016)
 University of Liverpool (2017-2018
 Famalicense Atletico Clube (2018-2019)

References

1993 births
Living people
Mexican men's volleyball players
Place of birth missing (living people)
Olympic volleyball players of Mexico
Volleyball players at the 2016 Summer Olympics
Sportspeople from Monterrey